The Counts of Girona ruled over the County of Girona (currently in Catalonia), the earliest-established of the Catalan Counties which formed the Marca Hispanica. The line was established by the Frankish noble Charles Rostan, Rostany, first Count of Girona (785-801) at the time of Sa'dun al Ruayni.

Subsequent counts

Odilon (801-812) 
Bera (812-820) 
Rampo (820-826) 
Bernard I (826-832), first reign
Berengar (832-835)
Bernard I (836-844), second reign
Sunifred I (844-848)
Wilfred I (848-852)
Odalric (852-858)
Humfrid (858-864)
Otger (861-870)
Bernat (870-878)
Wilfred II (878-897)

References

See also 
 Catalan Counties
 Marca Hispanica
 Principality of Catalonia

Catalan nobility
780s establishments